Yidnekatchew Tessema (Amharic: ይድነቃቸው ተሠማ; 11 September 1921 – 19 August 1987) was an Ethiopian professional footballer who played as a striker.

Soccer career 
He played for his school for five years, for the first Ethiopian soccer team, the St. George Club for 27 years. He played 27 times in international competitions. During the racially segregated footballing of the Italian occupation of Ethiopia, Yidnekatchew translated the rules of soccer into Amharic language for the Native Sports Office. The year following the end of the occupation, Yidnekatchew led the establishment of an official sports federation.

Tessema was a founding member of the Confederation of African Football (CAF) in the late 1950s. He served CAF as the deputy president between 1964 and 1972 and as the President between 1972 and 1987. He was also member of the African Sport Congress, International Olympics Committee, FIFA and President of the African Olympics Committee.

References

External links 
 Yidnekatchew, obituary on St. George's FC website
 Tales of Arada an article by Yidenkachew Tessema

1921 births
1987 deaths
People from Jimma
Presidents of the Confederation of African Football
Association football executives
Ethiopian footballers
Ethiopia international footballers
Saint George S.C. players
Ethiopia national football team managers
Ethiopian football managers
1963 African Cup of Nations managers
Ethiopian journalists
Association football forwards
Sportspeople from Oromia Region
20th-century journalists
Saint George S.C. managers
Members of the CAF Executive Committee